Noah Davis Thompson (died 1933) was an American writer, editor, publisher, and Civil Rights leader in the United States.

Personal life 
His first wife died as a result of complications related to the birth of their son. A few years later he married writer Eloise Bibb Thompson. They married in Chicago in 1911 and moved to Los Angeles. C. Bernard Thompson was his brother.

After his second wife died, he married Hattie Upton and they lived in the Dunbar Garden Apartments.

He was a Catholic.

References

African-American Catholics
1933 deaths
American male journalists
American civil rights activists
20th-century American journalists
20th-century American male writers